Patricia Thompson may refer to:
 Patricia Thompson (producer) (1947–2010), American television producer and documentary filmmaker
 Patricia Thompson (writer) (1926–2016), American philosopher and author
 Patricia Thompson (businesswoman) (born 1940), British businesswoman
 Patty Thompson (swimmer) (Patricia E. Thompson, born  1945), Canadian freestyle swimmer

See also
 Patricia Thomson (born 1937), Australian cricketer
 Pat Thomson (1940–1992), English-born Australian actress